César Díaz Martínez (born 5 January 1987 in Villamalea, Province of Albacete, Castilla–La Mancha) is a Spanish professional footballer who plays for Atlético Saguntino as a forward.

Honours
Spain U19
UEFA European Under-19 Championship: 2006

Notes

References

External links

1987 births
Living people
Sportspeople from the Province of Albacete
Spanish footballers
Footballers from Castilla–La Mancha
Association football forwards
Segunda División players
Segunda División B players
Tercera División players
Primera Federación players
Segunda Federación players
Atlético Albacete players
Albacete Balompié players
CD Alcoyano footballers
Zamora CF footballers
UD Almería B players
CD Teruel footballers
UD Melilla footballers
Racing de Santander players
CD Castellón footballers
Atlético Saguntino players
Spain youth international footballers